Leo Osaki (大﨑 玲央 | born July 8, 1991) is a Japanese soccer player who plays as a centre back and sometime defensive midfielder for Vissel Kobe in Japan's J1.

Career
Osaki signed with Carolina RailHawks in July 2014, making his professional debut on July 13, 2014 in a 1-2 loss against Indy Eleven.

He later signed with Yokohama FC for the 2016 J2 League season, making his first appearance as a substitute in a 2-0 win against Renofa Yamaguchi FC on March 20, 2016.

Club statistics
Updated to 4 December 2021.

Honours
Vissel Kobe
Emperor's Cup: 2019
Japanese Super Cup: 2020

References

External links
Profile at Tokushima Vortis
Profile at NASL

1991 births
Living people
Toin University of Yokohama alumni
Association football people from Tokyo
Japanese footballers
North American Soccer League players
J2 League players
North Carolina FC players
Yokohama FC players
Tokushima Vortis players
Vissel Kobe players
Association football midfielders